Seindé is a village in the Sami Department of Banwa Province in western Burkina Faso. In 2005, it had a population of 304.

References

Populated places in the Boucle du Mouhoun Region
Banwa Province